Juan David Ortiz (born 1983) is an American spree killer, serial killer, and former Border Patrol agent. He murdered four women, all sex workers, in September 2018. He was caught and arrested after a potential victim escaped and alerted police.

Personal life
Ortiz was a member of the United States Border Patrol for ten years, where he worked as an intelligence operator. He is also a  United States Navy veteran. He had no reported disciplinary issues while he served. He and his wife had three children. He earned a bachelor's degree from American Military University and a master's degree from St. Mary's University in Texas.

The Sheriff's Chief Deputy said Ortiz planned to commit suicide by cop, stocking up on weapons and trying to goad police with his phone when arrested. In the hours before his arrest, he posted two goodbyes to people he knew on Facebook.

Arrest
On September 14, 2018, Erika Pena had escaped from Ortiz's vehicle after he threatened her with a gun. The shirtless Pena ran towards a state trooper who happened to be at the same gas station pumping gas. She relayed all of the information to the officer and named the perpetrator as David and provided the make and model of his car. A BOLO was then put out and officers later found David's car at a nearby convenience store while an unsuspecting David was inside. Once David saw the officers, he ran on foot to a nearby parking garage of the Ava Hotel where he was found in the bed of a truck and arrested.

Victims
Ortiz committed the following homicides:
Melissa Ramirez, 29, killed on September 3, 2018
Claudine Anne Luera, 42, killed on September 13, 2018
Guiselda Alicia Hernandez Cantu, 35, killed on September 15, 2018
Janelle Ortiz, 28, killed on September 15, 2018

He is also suspected of kidnapping another woman, who escaped. The five victims were sex workers, all women, one transgender. Ortiz confessed after his arrest that he had started killing on September 3 and that he personally knew the first two victims. He allegedly killed the other two on the morning of September 15 in the five hours between the assault on the escaped woman and his capture.

Ortiz confessed to picking up a mother of two named Melissa Ramirez on September 3. She was 29 years old. After driving down a rural county road in Webb County, two miles outside the city, Ramirez got out of the vehicle to urinate, when Ortiz says he shot her multiple times. Her body was discovered the next day.

Ten days later, Ortiz allegedly picked up  42-year-old Claudine Anne Luera, a mother of five. After she confronted him about the disappearance of her friend Ramirez, she was getting out of his vehicle when he shot her in the head. She was found alive but died hours later in the hospital.

The last two victims were found on a five-mile stretch of Highway 35. Ortiz confessed to investigators that he took them in two trips from Laredo and killed them in similar manners. He led police to the site of the crime. Unlike Ramirez and Luera, he had no prior contact with these victims.

Aftermath
Ortiz has been charged in Webb County with four counts of murder and one count of aggravated assault with a deadly weapon, and was later indicted on one count of capital murder, aggravated assault with a deadly weapon, unlawful restraint and evading arrest. Ortiz has confessed to the four murders and fifth attempted murder to investigators, and allegedly has led investigators to one of the bodies. During interviews with investigators, Ortiz reportedly expressed a hatred of prostitutes. Investigators have stated that they have not ruled out the possibility that Ortiz had additional victims.

In January 2019, Ortiz pleaded not guilty on four counts of murder and one count of assault, despite giving a taped confession to investigators.

In October 2022, the District Attorney announced that he will not seek the death penalty against Ortiz.

Ortiz's trial began November 28, 2022.

On December 7, 2022, Ortiz was convicted in all four murders and was sentenced to life in prison without parole.

References

External links
 Juan D. Ortiz Jail Record, Webb County Sheriff's Office
 Press conference - Webb County Sheriff's Office (September 17, 2018)

1983 births
2018 crimes in Texas
American serial killers
American spree killers
Living people
People charged with assault
People convicted of murder by Texas
People from Laredo, Texas
Place of birth missing (living people)
Prisoners sentenced to life imprisonment by Texas
September 2018 crimes in the United States
United States Border Patrol agents
United States Navy sailors